Benjamin Ramamonjisoa is a Malagasy politician. A member of the National Assembly of Madagascar, he was elected as a member of the Tiako I Madagasikara party; he represents the constituency of Antananarivo Atsimondrano.

References
Profile on National Assembly site

Year of birth missing (living people)
Place of birth missing (living people)
Living people
Members of the National Assembly (Madagascar)
Tiako I Madagasikara politicians